Muller Frères were French glassmakers located in Lunéville, France. They were renowned for producing art nouveau glassworks such as vases and lampshades.

The Muller family originally came from Alsace. Some members of the family worked together with Émile Gallé before starting their own business.

External links 

 Muller Frères biographies, signatures (including fakes), books, auction results, etc...)

Defunct companies of France
French glass artists
Art Nouveau